is a 1958 black-and-white action Japanese film directed by Toshio Masuda.

Red Quay was one of the many successful collaborations between director Toshio Masuda and actor Yujiro Ishihara which defined the Nikkatsu action film genre.

Plot
Tominaga Jiro, who slaughtered five yakuza in Tokyo and now he is staying at the Matsuyama group in Kobe. Tominaga accidentally witnesses the scene where a restaurant owner Sugita is killed due to the trouble of drug trading at Kobe Port.

Cast 
 Yujiro Ishihara : Tominaga Jiro
 Mie Kitahara : Sugita Keiko
 Masumi Okada : Tabō
 Sanae Nakahara : Mammy
 Shirō Ōsaka : Noro
 Jun Miyazaki : Sugita
 Hideaki Nitani : Katsumata

Release
Red Quay was released on 23 September 1958.

References

External links 
 

Japanese black-and-white films
1958 films
Films directed by Toshio Masuda
Nikkatsu films
1950s Japanese films